"Me Llamas" is a song by Colombian band Piso 21, from their second studio album Ubuntu (2018). It was released on 8 July 2016, by the Mexican division of Warner Music Group as the album's lead single. On 2 December 2016, a remix featuring Colombian singer Maluma was released. The remix helped improve the song's overall chart performance and lead to the single having more success in Spain and various Latin American countries. The official music video for the remix was released on 1 December 2016 on Piso 21's YouTube account and has received over 520 million views.

The song is part of the soundtrack of the first season of the Colombian telenovela La ley del corazón.

Lyric video 
The lyric video for "Me Llamas" premiered on 7 July 2016 on Piso 21's YouTube account and has been viewed over 90 million times.

Music video 
The music video for "Me Llamas" premiered on 2 September 2016 on Piso 21's YouTube account. The music video was directed by David Bohórquez and has been viewed over 30 million times.

Track listing

Charts

Weekly charts

Year-end charts

Certifications

References

External links

2016 songs
2016 singles
2010s ballads
Spanish-language songs
Pop ballads
Warner Music Mexico singles
Maluma songs
Piso 21 songs